Hoke Building may refer to the following places:
Hoke Building (Hutchinson, Kansas), listed on the National Register of Historic Places
Hoke Building (Stillwater, Oklahoma), listed on the National Register of Historic Places